Mare Nostrum is a short film by the Award-Winning Filmmakers Syrian-American filmmakers, Rana Kazkaz and Anas Khalaf.

Logline 
On the shore of the Mediterranean Sea, a Syrian Father makes a decision that puts his daughter's life at risk.

Honors

External links

2016 films
Films shot in Jordan